Valencia High School is a public secondary school located in the neighborhood of Valencia in the city of Santa Clarita, California, United States. It is a part of the William S. Hart Union High School District.

Valencia High School is ranked in Newsweek's 2012 list of America's Best High Schools. The list is based on six components provided by school administrators: graduation rate (25 percent), college matriculation rate (25 percent), AP/IB/AICE tests taken per student (25 percent), average SAT/ACT scores (10 percent), average AP/IB/AICE scores (10 percent), and AP courses offered per student (5 percent).

History
Valencia High School opened on September 9, 1994. The school received its first full accreditation from WASC in 1998. In 2001, Dr. Paul A. Priesz was named California Principal of the Year. This was the year that Valencia High School's student population reached over 3,500 students.
 2002 - Valencia High School's API test scores were the highest in the district. The boys’ volleyball program secured the first CIF Championship in the school's history. The co-ed cheer team placed first in the state competition.
 2004 - Valencia High School dedicated a stadium to Dr. Paul A. Priesz. Valencia High School received a full accreditation from WASC.
 2006 - The boys’ volleyball team won its 3rd CIF championship. Valencia High School was recognized for its state model School-to-Career program. The softball team won the school's first official national championship.
 2008 - The boys’ volleyball team won the national championship. The school's softball team went on to clinch another CIF Championship. Valencia High School's Speech and Debate team won local, state, and national awards. The Valencia High School dance team won a National Championship. Valencia High School scored above 800 on the Academic Performance Index (API). This achievement placed Valencia High School among the top achieving high schools in both the state and the nation.
 2009 - The Valencia High School dance team brought home another national championship.

Principals
In chronological order:

 Dr. Paul A. Priesz
 John Costanzo
 Stephen Ford
 Dr. Pete Getz (since 2020)

Activities

VTV 
VTV is an early morning news broadcast to the school. Valencia High School's video program has entered their productions into competitions such as STN, NFFTY, All American High School Film Festival (AAHSFF), and the Santa Clarita Valley Film Festival.

Choir

The Concert Choir has repeatedly achieved the ratings of "Gold Choir" and "Choir of the Festival".

Band

The band performs at home football games, school rallies, community events, and several competitive regional marching band competitions. The band has won gold medals in the Southern California School Band and Orchestra Association(SCSBOA) three times. 
The band has performed at Band of America events as well as Hawaii, Carnegie Hall, and Florida.

Color Guard 
The color guard performs at home football games and at school rallies. It also has competitive seasons for both the first and second semester of the school year. Within the first semester, the team performs with the Valencia High School marching band. During the second semester, the team takes part in WGASC and WGI competitions.

ROTC
ROTC’s goal is to train high school cadets in citizenship. The other goals are to instill responsibility, character, and self-discipline.

Medical Science Academy

Athletics

Boys Volleyball 
The boys’ volleyball team won 112 consecutive league matches dating back to 2001, before losing 3-1 to Saugus High School on March 21, 2013. They advanced to the CIF championship game in each season from 2001 to 2006, winning in 2003, 2004, 2006, and 2008. They have won the CIF championship in four of the previous six seasons, with a 186-27 record since 2003, posting a school best 35-2 record in 2008. The winning streak spanned from 2001 to March 21, 2013.

Swim Team
In 2014 and 2015, the varsity teams won first place in the Foothill League. In those same years, the teams had finished in the top 10 at the CIF Southern Section competition.

Softball Team
The softball team has won eight consecutive Foothill League championships. They have also won back to back CIF championships and were ranked number one in the nation in 2007.

Athletic Awards

Foothill League Champions
Valencia High School competes in the Foothill League athletic conference. The other schools in the league are Canyon, Castaic, Golden Valley, Hart, Saugus, and West Ranch High Schools. The schools that no longer participate are John Burroughs High School and Burbank High School.
 Baseball - 2002, 2003, 2004, 2006, 2007, 2009, 2010, 2011, 2016, 2017, 2019
 Boys Basketball - 1999, 2005, 2008, 2010, 2011, 2015, 2017, 2019, 2020
 Girls Basketball - 2000, 2001, 2005, 2015, 2016, 2017, 2019
 Football - 2004, 2009, 2010, 2011, 2012, 2013, 2014, 2015, 2016, 2017, 2018, 2019
 Boys Golf - 2000, 2002
 Girls Golf - 2004, 2005, 2006
 Boys Soccer - 2016
 Girls Soccer - 2001, 2009
 Softball - 2001, 2002, 2003, 2004, 2005, 2006, 2007, 2008, 2009, 2016, 2017, 2018
 Boys Swimming - 2014, 2015
 Girls Swimming - 2014, 2015, 2017
 Boys Tennis - 2002, 2003, 2004, 2006, 2007, 2009, 2010, 2011, 2012, 2013, 2019
 Girls Tennis - 2002, 2003, 2004, 2005, 2006, 2007, 2008, 2009, 2012, 2014, 2015
 Track & Field - 2001, 2016
 Boys Volleyball - 2001, 2002, 2003, 2004, 2005, 2006, 2007, 2008, 2009, 2010, 2011, 2012, 2014, 2015
 Girls Volleyball - 1999, 2002, 2003, 2004, 2005, 2006, 2007, 2008, 2009, 2010, 2012, 2015
Girls Lacrosse- 2021

CIF Champions
 Boys Volleyball 2003 - Division II
 Boys Volleyball 2004 - Division II
 Boys Volleyball 2006 - Division II
 Boys Volleyball 2008 - Division II
 Softball 2007 - Division l
 Softball 2008 - Division l
 Track & Field - 2009
 Girls Tennis - 2014
 Football 2021 - Division V

CIF Finalist
 Football - 1999
 Football - 2001
 Boys Volleyball - 2001
 Boys Volleyball - 2002
 Boys Golf - 2002
 Boys Volleyball - 2003
 Girls Soccer - 2003
 Football - 2004
 Boys Volleyball - 2004
 Girls Golf - 2004
 Softball - 2005
 Girls Golf - 2005
 Girls Tennis - 2005
 Boys Volleyball - 2005
 Boys Volleyball - 2006
 Girls Tennis - 2006
 Softball - 2007
 Girls Tennis - 2007
 Boys Volleyball - 2008
 Softball - 2008
 Track & Field - 2009
 Boys Volleyball - 2015
 Football - 2017
 Football - 2021

State Champions
 Softball - 2007
 Boys Volleyball - 2008
 Track & Field - 2009

National Champions
 Dance Team - 2003
 Boys Volleyball - 2006
 Softball - 2007
 Dance Team - 2007
 Dance Team - 2008
 Boys Volleyball - 2008
 Dance Team - 2009
 Dance Team - 2010
 Dance Team - 2011

Student demographics

As of the 2021-22 academic year, Valencia was the most populous school in the Hart District, with 2,484 students. 44.2% of students were non-Hispanic white, 23.6% were Hispanic, 20.8% were Asian American, and 3.9% were African American. As of 2020-21, 395 students (15.0%) were eligible for free or reduced-price lunch.

Notable alumni
Lulu Antariksa, actor and singer (Class of 2011)
Taylor Dooley, actor (Class of 2011)
Kyle Ensing, professional volleyball player and member of the 2020 Olympic roster (Class of 2015)
Robert Hy Gorman, actor (Class of 1998)
Keston Hiura, MLB player for the Milwaukee Brewers (Class of 2014)
Max Homa, professional PGA golfer (Class of 2009)
Taylor Lautner, actor (Class of 2010)
Jared Oliva, MLB player for the Pittsburgh Pirates (Class of 2013)
Naya Rivera, actress (Class of 2005)
Mackenzie Rosman, actress (Class of 2007)
Mercedes Scelba-Shorte, runner-up of America's Next Top Model (Class of 2000)
Eric Shannon, professional soccer player for the Charleston Battery (Class of 2009)
Tedric Thompson, NFL safety for the Seattle Seahawks (Class of 2013)
Ashley Tisdale, actress (Class of 2003)
Shane Vereen, NFL player for the New York Giants (Class of 2007)
Manuel White, NFL player for the Washington Redskins (Class of 2000)
Danny Worth, MLB player for the Detroit Tigers (Class of 2004)

Filming location 
Valencia High School was used as a set for the films Bio-Dome, Romy and Michelle's High School Reunion, and Pleasantville. It was also used for filming the TV series Sweet Valley High. In 2019, George Salcedo's two short films Witness to Murder and Winger were also filmed on campus.

References

External links
 Valencia High School

Educational institutions established in 1994
Public high schools in California
High schools in Santa Clarita, California
1994 establishments in California